Arithmetica is an Ancient Greek text on mathematics written by the mathematician Diophantus in the 3rd century AD.  It is a collection of 130 algebraic problems giving numerical solutions of determinate equations (those with a unique solution) and indeterminate equations.

Summary
Equations in the book are presently called Diophantine equations. The method for solving these equations is known as Diophantine analysis.  Most of the Arithmetica problems lead to quadratic equations.

In Book 3, Diophantus solves problems of finding values which make two linear expressions simultaneously into squares or cubes. In book 4, he finds rational powers between given numbers. He also noticed that numbers of the form  cannot be the sum of two squares. Diophantus also appears to know that every number can be written as the sum of four squares. If he did know this result (in the sense of having proved it as opposed to merely conjectured it), his doing so would be truly remarkable:  even Fermat, who stated the result, failed to provide a proof of it and it was not settled until Joseph Louis Lagrange proved it using results due to Leonhard Euler.

Arithmetica was originally written in thirteen books, but the Greek manuscripts that survived to the present contain no more than six books. In 1968, Fuat Sezgin found four previously unknown books of Arithmetica at the shrine of Imam Rezā in the holy Islamic city of Mashhad in northeastern Iran. The four books are thought to have been translated from Greek to Arabic by Qusta ibn Luqa (820–912). Norbert Schappacher has written:
[The four missing books] resurfaced around 1971 in the Astan Quds Library in Meshed (Iran) in a copy from 1198 AD.  It was not catalogued under the name of Diophantus (but under that of Qusta ibn Luqa) because the librarian was apparently not able to read the main line of the cover page where Diophantus’s name appears in geometric Kufi calligraphy.

Arithmetica became known to mathematicians in the Islamic world in the tenth century when Abu'l-Wefa translated it into Arabic.

Syncopated algebra

Diophantus was a Hellenistic mathematician who lived circa 250 AD, but the uncertainty of this date is so great that it may be off by more than a century. He is known for having written Arithmetica, a treatise that was originally thirteen books but of which only the first six have survived. Arithmetica has very little in common with traditional Greek mathematics since it is divorced from geometric methods, and it is different from Babylonian mathematics in that Diophantus is concerned primarily with exact solutions, both determinate and indeterminate, instead of simple approximations.

The main difference between Diophantine syncopated algebra and modern algebraic notation is that the former lacked special symbols for operations, relations, and exponentials. So for example, what would be written in modern notation as

which can be rewritten as

would be written in Diophantus's syncopated notation as

where the symbols represent the following:

Unlike in modern notation, the coefficients come after the variables and that addition is represented by the juxtaposition of terms. A literal symbol-for-symbol translation of Diophantus's syncopated equation into a modern symbolic equation would be the following:

where to clarify, if the modern parentheses and plus are used then the above equation can be rewritten as:

Arithmetica is a collection of some 150 solved problems with specific numbers and there is no postulational development nor is a general method explicitly explained, although generality of method may have been intended and there is no attempt to find all of the solutions to the equations. Arithmetica does contain solved problems involving several unknown quantities, which are solved, if possible, by expressing the unknown quantities in terms of only one of them. Arithmetica also makes use of the identities:

See also

 Diophantus II.VIII
 Muhammad ibn Mūsā al-Khwārizmī

Citations

References

External links

 Diophantus Alexandrinus, Pierre de Fermat, Claude Gaspard Bachet de Meziriac, Diophanti Alexandrini Arithmeticorum libri 6, et De numeris multangulis liber unus. Cum comm. C(laude) G(aspar) Bacheti et observationibus P(ierre) de Fermat. Acc. doctrinae analyticae inventum novum, coll. ex variis eiu. Tolosae 1670, .

3rd-century books
Ancient Greek mathematical works
History of algebra